Baahubali: The Conclusion is a 2017 Indian epic historical fiction film written and directed by S. S. Rajamouli and produced by Arka Media Works.

The Second of two cinematic parts, The Conclusion opened worldwide on 28 April 2017 to critical acclaim and record-breaking box-office success, becoming the highest-grossing film in India and the second-highest-grossing Indian film worldwide, and the highest-grossing South Indian film.

At the 65th National Film Awards, The Conclusion won the awards for Best Popular Film Providing Wholesome Entertainment, Best Stunt Choreographer and Best Special Effects.

The Conclusion released to positive reviews from critics. It was also praised by the actors of the film industry alike. The film has garnered the Telstra People's Choice Award at the 2017 Indian Film Festival of Melbourne. It won three National Film Awards: Best Popular Film Providing Wholesome Entertainment, Best Special Effects and Best Stunt Choreographer. The Conclusion was premiered at the British Film Institute, and was the inaugural feature film at the 39th Moscow International Film Festival. It is showcased in the "Indian Panorama" section of the 48th International Film Festival of India.

Accolades

Footnotes

References

Baahubali (franchise)
Baahubali: The Conclusion